The 2010 Boys' Youth South American Volleyball Championship was the 17th edition of the tournament, organised by South America's governing volleyball body, the Confederación Sudamericana de Voleibol (CSV) for Under-19 teams. It was held in Venezuela. The top national team other than Argentina qualified to the 2011 Youth World Championship, Argentina had already secured a berth as Host.

Teams

Competition System
The competition system for the 2010 Boys' Youth South American Championship was a single Round-Robin system. Each team plays once against each of the 5 remaining teams. Points are accumulated during the whole tournament, and the final ranking is determined by the total points gained.

Results
All times are VET (UTC−04:30).

|}

Matches

|}

Final standing

Individual awards

Most Valuable Player

Best Spiker

Best Blocker

Best Server

Best Setter

Best Digger

Best Receiver

Best Libero

References

External links
CSV official website

Men's South American Volleyball Championships
S
Volleyball
V